The 2016 United States House of Representatives elections in Connecticut were held on Tuesday, November 8, 2016 to elect the five U.S. representatives from the state of Connecticut, one from each of the state's five congressional districts. The elections coincided with the 2016 U.S. presidential election, as well as other elections to the House of Representatives, elections to the United States Senate and various state and local elections. The primaries were held on August 9.

District 1

Democrat John Larson has represented this district since 1999.
He is running for re-election.

Results

District 2

Democrat Joe Courtney has represented this district since 2007.
He is running for re-election. Daria Novak, a radio-TV talk show host who sought the seat twice before, is the Republican nominee. Jonathan Pelto, a former Democratic member of the Connecticut House of Representatives, is the Green Party nominee. Daniel Reale is the nominee for the Libertarian Party.

Results

District 3

Democrat Rosa DeLauro has represented this district since 1991.
She is running for re-election.

Results

District 4

Democrat Jim Himes has represented this district since 2009. 
He is running for re-election. John Shaban is running against Himes as a Republican.

Results

District 5

Democrat Elizabeth Esty has represented this district since 2013.

Results

See also
 United States House of Representatives elections, 2016
 United States elections, 2016

References

Connecticut
2016
United States House of Representatives